Coal is the third studio album by Norwegian progressive metal band Leprous, released on 20 May 2013.

It is the last album to feature drummer Tobias Ørnes Andersen, who was featured on all albums until then, and bassist Rein Blomquist.

Track listing

Personnel 
 Einar Solberg – vocals, synthesizer, grand piano
 Tor Oddmund Suhrke – guitar, baritone guitar
 Øystein Landsverk – guitar
 Rein Blomquist – bass
 Tobias Ørnes Andersen – drums, electronic drums, additional percussions

Other musicians
 Ihsahn – string arrangement on "Chronic", guest vocals on "Contaminate Me"
 Håkon Aase – violin on "Contaminate Me"

Technical
 Vegard Tveitan, Heidi Solberg Tveitan – production
 Leprous – production, editing
 Rune Børø – grand piano and violin recording
 Jens Bogren – mixing
 Tony Lindgren – mastering
 Ritxi Ostáriz – art direction and design
 Jeff Jordan – cover art

References

2013 albums
Leprous albums
Century Media Records albums
Inside Out Music albums